The Vienna-Bratislava metropolitan region is one of 5 polycentric conurbations in European Union. It is located in the five administrative units (NUTS-2 class).

The distance from Vienna to Bratislava is approximately 50 km.

See also
List of metropolitan areas in Europe

References

Metropolitan areas by population
Metropolitan areas
 
Europe, metropolitan areas